Khandaker Rashiduzzaman Dudu was a Bangladesh Awami League politician and the Member of Parliament from Kushtia-3.

Career
Dudu was the vice-president of Kushtia Government College unit of Bangladesh Chhatra League. He served as the Chairman of Rupali Bank for five years. He was the President of Federation of Bangladesh Chambers of Commerce and Industry and Kushtia Chambers of Commerce. He served as the President of Kushtia District unit of Bangladesh Awami League and former president of Kushtia District unit of Bangladesh Jubo League. He was elected to the 9th parliament in 2008 from Kushtia-3 as a candidate of Bangladesh Awami League.

Death
He died on 4 February 2014 in Apollo Hospital Dhaka, Bangladesh. He is survived by his wife, son, and 2 daughters; one of whom is a Director at Bashundhara Group.

References

Awami League politicians
2014 deaths
9th Jatiya Sangsad members
1944 births